Artell is an English surname. Notable people with the surname include:

 David Artell (born 1980), English footballer and manager
 Darlene Artell Hartman (born 1934), American writer and speaker

See also
 Artel (disambiguation)

English-language surnames